Emergency medical responders are people who are specially trained to provide out-of-hospital care in medical emergencies.  There are many different types of emergency medical responders, each with different levels of training, ranging from first aid and basic life support. Emergency medical responders have a very limited scope of practice and have the least amount of comprehensive education, clinical experience or clinical skills of emergency medical services (EMS) personnel. The EMR program is not intended to replace the roles of emergency medical technicians or paramedics and their wide range of specialties. Emergency medical responders typically assist in rural regions providing basic life support where pre-hospital health professionals are not available due to limited resources or infrastructure.

"Emergency medical responder" is a broad term, used either to describe a certain EMS certification level, or generally to describe those who respond to medical emergencies. Specifically used, an Emergency Medical Responder is an EMS certification level used to describe a level of EMS provider below that of an emergency medical technician and paramedic. Broadly used, a first responder is the first medically trained personnel who comes in contact with a patient. This could be a passerby, citizen volunteer, or fire department, police, or emergency medical services personnel.

In Canada 

Emergency Medical Responder (EMR), Primary Care Paramedic (PCP), Advanced Care Paramedic (ACP) and Critical Care Paramedic (CCP) in Canada are the titles and levels of practitioners recognized by the National Occupational Competency Profile  Paramedic Association of Canada.

Generally speaking, Emergency Medical Responders (EMRs) require 80 to 120 hours of training. Primary Care Paramedic (PCP), depending on province, require generally a two-year diploma of paramedicine. Advanced Care Paramedics (ACP) require an additional year of training and clinical experience totaling three years of education, and Critical Care Paramedics (CCP) require a final year of education totaling four years of education.

Under the new NOCP, most providers that work in ambulances are identified as 'paramedics'. However, in some cases, the most prevalent level of emergency prehospital care is that which is provided by the Emergency Medical Responder (EMR). Generally speaking, emergency medical responders (EMRs) require 80 to 120 hours of training. As a group, EMRs staff rural ambulance stations, community volunteer ambulance services, fire departments, police departments, industrial ambulances or mobile treatment centers. For many small communities, without this level of certification, the operation of a much-needed small community ambulance system might not be possible. EMRs across Canada contribute an important role in the chain of survival. It is a level of practice that is least comprehensive (clinically speaking), and is also generally not consistent with any medical acts beyond advanced first-aid and oxygen administration, with the possible exception of automated external defibrillation, which is still a regulated medical act in Canada, although one which is increasingly performed by members of the public under a legal exemption that allows members of the public to undertake some controlled medical acts in emergencies. This level of training is equivalent to an Emergency Medical Technician in the United States.

Many paramedics in Canada at all levels from Emergency Medical Responder (EMR), Primary Care Paramedic (PCP), Advanced Care Paramedic (ACP) and Critical Care Paramedic (CCP), are combining their diplomas of paramedicine with a bachelor's degree of paramedicine which is heading towards the standard of educational requirements in Canada. Emergency Medical Responders would not be eligible for these educational advances due to their limited scope of practice and education.

In the United States

History 
The U.S. Department of Transportation (DOT) recognized a gap between the typical eight hours training required for providing basic first aid (as taught by the Red Cross) and the 180 hours typical of an EMT-Basic program.  Also, some rural communities could not afford the comprehensive training and highly experienced instructors required for a full EMT course. The First Responder training program began in 1979 as an outgrowth of the "Crash Injury Management" course.

In 1995 the DOT issued a manual for an intermediate level of training called "First Responder." This training can be completed in twenty-four to sixty hours.  Importantly, this training can be conducted by an EMT-Basic with some field experience, which is a resource available in-house for many volunteer fire departments which do not have the resources or funds to conduct full EMT training.  The first responder training is intended to fill the gap between first aid and Emergency Medical Technician.

The American Red Cross conducts a course titled "Emergency Medical Response" that fits this definition.

In the US the term "Emergency Medical Responder" has largely replaced the term "Certified First Responder" or "Medical First Responder" beginning in 2012.

"Emergency Medical Responder" or "EMR"  is an EMS certification level recognized by the National Registry of Emergency Medical Technicians.

The term "emergency medical responder" is used loosely in many states, with "first responder" and "medical first responder" still being common terms.

By 2015, most states recognized the level of Emergency Medical Responder.

Scope of practice 

Emergency Medical Responders (EMR) in the United States provide initial emergency care first on the scene (police/fire department/search and rescue) and support Emergency Medical Technicians and Paramedics when they arrive. The skills allowed at this level include taking vital signs, bleeding control, positive pressure ventilation with a bag valve mask, oropharyngeal airway, supplemental oxygen administration, oral suctioning, cardio-pulmonary resuscitation (CPR), use of an automated external defibrillator (AED), splinting, and assisting in the administration of basic medications such as epinephrine auto-injectors and oral glucose. They are also trained in packaging, moving and transporting patients. Due to the opioid epidemic, EMRs in certain states or regions are also trained and allowed to give Naloxone and utilize supraglottic airways.

Procedures by certification level
These are the minimum skills recommendations put forth by the National Highway Traffic Safety Administration and endorsed by the National Registry of Emergency Medical Technicians. Each State, region, and agencies may add to or deduct from this list as they see medically fit.

First responder skills and limitations 

First responders can serve as secondary providers with some volunteer EMS services. An Emergency Medical Responder can be seen either as an advanced first aid provider, or as a limited provider of emergency medical care when more advanced providers have not yet arrived or are not available. Skills that Emergency Medical Responders are commonly not allowed to perform (that EMTs are) include insertion of traction splinting, administration of nebulized albuterol, administration of ASA, pulse oximetry, glucometry, or insertion of supraglottic airways. However, certain regions and states (such as Wisconsin) or medical directors may allow them to assist in or actually perform these skills.

Rescue

The National Fire Protection Association standards 1006 and 1670 state that all "rescuers" must have medical training to perform any technical rescue operation, including cutting the vehicle itself during an extrication. Therefore, in most all rescue environments, whether it is an EMS or fire department that runs the rescue, the actual rescuers who cut the vehicle and run the extrication scene or perform any rescue such as rope rescues or swift water rescue, etc., are Emergency Medical Responders, Emergency Medical Technicians, or Paramedics, as most every rescue has a patient involved.

Traditional Emergency Medical Responders 

Emergency Medical Responder training is considered a bare minimum for emergency service workers who may be sent out in response to an emergency call. It is typically required for firefighters. The Emergency Medical Responder level of medical training is also often required for police officers and search and rescue personnel. Many Emergency Medical Responders have location specific training such as water rescue or mountain rescue and must take advanced courses to be certified (i.e. lifeguard, ski patrol).

Other types of Emergency Medical Responders 
Many people who do not fall into the earlier mentioned categories seek out or receive this type of training because they are likely to be first on the scene of a medical emergency, or because they work far from medical help.

Some of these other Emergency Medical Responders include:

 Firefighters
 campus police
 Lifeguards
 Ski patrollers
 Park rangers
 Event first aid staff
 Security guards
 Emergency management personnel
 HAZMAT personnel
 Community Emergency Response Team (CERT) members 
 Disaster relief personnel 
 Street medics
 Athletic trainers
 SCUBA divers
 Bodyguards
 Designated industrial or corporate workers in a large facility (industrial plant or large office building) or at a remote site (oil rig, fish-packing plant, commercial vessel) (i.e. "Medical Emergency Response Team (MERT) Scheme)
 General aviation pilots and commercial flight attendants

Levels of training 
First responders are generally trained to provide advanced first aid and basic life support. These responders may be laypeople, employees, or volunteers associated with an emergency service. In the US, the term "Emergency Medical Responder" largely replaced the term "Certified First Responder" beginning in 2012.

Emergency medical technicians (EMT) are the next level of providers. Within the United States, there are three common levels of EMTs, each with an increased scope of practice: EMT, Advanced Emergency Medical Technician (AEMT), and Paramedic. Paramedics have the most training of these levels. Paramedics and AEMTs perform advanced life support. EMTs and EMRs perform basic life support.

Remote areas 
In the field of wilderness first aid, medical providers receive additional training relating to wilderness medicine.  There are several levels of certification that parallel the aforementioned levels, which include Wilderness First Responder and Wilderness Emergency Medical Technician.

See also 
 Emergency medical services
 Emergency medical responder levels by U.S. state

References

1979 in science
1979 introductions